Pretty In Puke is the fifth recording and third EP by The Giraffes.  Recorded and mixed at Studio G in Brooklyn NY, by Joel Hamilton, it contains four new songs and a new recording of "I'll Be Your Daddy" which had previously appeared on the EP Helping You Help Yourself in a different version.

Track listing

All songs written by The Giraffes

"This Is Sickness" – 2:33
"Twin Girls" – 3:43
"Tournequet" – 4:35
"Pisda Mati" – 3:38
"I'll Be Your Daddy" – 3:59

References

External links
 The Giraffes // Pretty in Puke at Apesauce Records

The Giraffes (Brooklyn band) albums
2006 EPs